The 2008 Southern Conference men's basketball tournament took place between Friday, March 7 and Monday, March 10 in North Charleston, South Carolina at the North Charleston Coliseum. All rounds were available on ESPN 910. The semifinals were televised by SportSouth, and the Southern Conference Championship Game was televised by ESPN2.

Bracket

See also
List of Southern Conference men's basketball champions

References

Tournament
Southern Conference men's basketball tournament
Southern Conference men's basketball tournament
SoCon
Southern Conference men's basketball tournament